Thiranottam is a 1978-made Indian Malayalam-language drama film directed by V. Ashok Kumar and written by Kumar and Pachalloor Sasi. The film stars Mohanlal, C. Chandramohan, Ravikumar, Maniyanpilla Raju, and Renu Chandra in their debut roles. Mohanlal played Kuttappan, a mentally disabled servant. The film was completed and censored in 1978, but was not released immediately, it was released in a single theatre in 2005. Thiranottam is known for being the acting debut of Mohanlal, then 18 years old, even though his onscreen debut was Manjil Virinja Pookkal (1980).

Plot

Thiranottam is the tale of Kuttappan, a mentally disabled servant and the life around him.

Cast
Mohanlal as Kuttappan
C. Chandramohan
Ravikumar
Maniyanpilla Raju
Renu Chandra
Ajith Rajagopal

Production
Thiranottam marks Mohanlal's acting debut in cinema. His first shot took place on 3 September 1978 at 11:30 AM in front of Mohanlal's house in Mudavanmugal, Trivandrum. He was 18 years old then and was studying in college. Mohanlal played Kuttappan, a mentally disabled servant. Currently, the print of the film belongs to a television channel, who have bought the satellite right of the film. The film was completed and censored, but could not release then, after 25 years, the film was telecast on Asianet. Their plan was to make a Tamil film after Thiranottam and had even recorded music for it, but before that could happen, Mohanlal won the audition for the villain role in Manjil Virinja Pookkal (1980) in which he made his onscreen debut.

The film was made by Mohanlal and his friends, Ashok Kumar (director), Late Sasheendran (Producer), Priyadarshan (Asst.director), Suresh Kumar (clap boy) and the cast were Ravi Kumar, Mohanlal, Renu Chandra, Chandra Mohan and others.

Director Priyadarshan and producer Suresh Kumar also debuted in the movie industry through this film. While Priyadarshan worked as assistant director, Suresh Kumar was the clap boy.

The film was completed and censored, but couldn't release then, even though a premier show was arranged. Years later, it was released in a single theatre at Kollam.

In September 2014, Mohanlal appealed on Facebook to trace the child actor who had done the first shot along with him. He mentioned, "There is a boy who shared screen space with me in it. However, I am unable to remember who he was. If any of you know his identity, do come forward and inform me. I really wish to meet him once again." The search ended on a sad note when Prasad Nooranad, a freelance director, found out that the boy in question had since died.

Soundtrack
The film's original soundtrack was composed by M. G. Radhakrishnan, with lyrics written by O. N. V. Kurup. K. J. Yesudas sang two songs.

References

1970s Malayalam-language films
1978 films
Films shot in Thiruvananthapuram
Films scored by M. G. Radhakrishnan